Frances I. Lewitter is a computational biologist and the founding director of the Whitehead Institute’s Bioinformatics and Research Computing (BaRC) program.

Education and career
Lewitter gained her PhD in human genetics and statistical genetics from the University of Colorado Boulder in 1979. Following a postdoctoral position at Harvard Medical School where she worked on the GenBank project, she joined the Whitehead Institute to run what is considered to be one of the first bioinformatics core facilities.

Lewitter is a strong advocate for bioinformatics education, and was education editor of PLOS Computational Biology from 2005 to 2014.

Awards and Honors
Lewitter was awarded the 2017 Outstanding Contributions to ISCB Award by the International Society for Computational Biology. In 2022, she was elected a Fellow of the ISCB.

References

Living people

Year of birth missing (living people)
Women computational biologists
Computational biologists
Fellows of the International Society for Computational Biology